Hosszúhetény is the most populous village in Baranya county, southwest Hungary, a significant centre of village tourism.
It is located 18 kilometres northeast to Pécs, the county capital, in a valley between the feet of Zengő, the highest peak of the Mecsek mountains and the peak called Hármashegy.

The valley has been inhabited since the Stone Age. Two other nearby villages belong to the administration of Hosszúhetény: Püspökszentlászló and Kisújbánya.

Located in an environmentally protected area, a special microclimate producing rare flower species like Paeonia officinalis ssp, among picturesque mountains, the three villages are popular among tourists who arrive from all parts of Hungary and abroad. One of the main sites is the arboretum of the episcopal castle in Püspökszentlászló.

Tourism gives an increasing portion of the villagers' revenues after the decline of coal mining which flourished in the region between the 1950s and 1990.

NATO radar 
In the 2000s the Hungarian government wanted to build a NATO radar station on the top of the Zengő, but the plan foundered in 2005 on fierce resistance from the inhabitants of Hosszúhetény and nearby Pécsvárad and environmentalist groups including Greenpeace.

People 
 Bertalan Andrásfalvy, politician, ethnographer
 Gyula Bocz, sculptor
 Zsuzsa Deák, graphic artist
 Alajos Degré, jurist
 Mária Fischer, writer
 Tamás Herbert, environmentalist
 Károly Hetényi Varga, writer

International relations

Twin towns — Sister cities 
Hosszúhetény is twinned with:
  Morolo, Italy
  Hetin, Serbia
  Săvădisla, Romania
  Alfdorf, Germany

See also
Bárányles
Wheelbarrow Olympics

References

External links

Hosszúhetény's website (Hungarian, English)
Biggest Hosszúhetény community page in Facebook
Hosszúhetény photoes page in Facebook

Populated places in Baranya County
Hungarian German communities
Romani communities in Hungary